The Context  is a live current affairs programme that airs Monday to Thursday on the BBC News Channel, BBC Parliament and BBC World News. Under the names 100 Days, 100 Days+, Beyond 100 Days  and BBC News with Katty and Christian, it was jointly hosted live by Katty Kay from Washington D.C. and Christian Fraser from London, and ran on the BBC News Channel and BBC World News from the inauguration of President Donald Trump until the departure of Kay from the BBC in June 2021. It focused on the current US Administration, global politics, Brexit and news from around the world, with attempted punches of irreverent wit and fun. Fraser occasionally presented from Brussels (during European Council meetings) and also from the BBC Singapore Studio for a week during the 2018 North Korea–United States summit. For a week in May 2018, Kay and Fraser were both presenting from London and Windsor during the wedding of Prince Harry and Meghan Markle.

After having been off air for six months following Kay's departure, the programme was relaunched in January 2022 as Context, later changed to The Context. It is now presented by Christian Fraser alone, and like its predecessor, it airs at 21:00 GMT Monday to Thursday on the BBC News Channel and BBC World News.

History
The programme debuted in 2017 as 100 Days and aired daily to document the first one hundred days of US president Donald Trump in administration.  After the first 100 days of President Trump's presidency passed, the programme continued; it was briefly called 100 Days+ before it was launched in September 2017 as Beyond 100 Days in the same timeslot Monday to Thursday right after Focus on Africa and BBC News at Six. Beyond 100 Days was originally an edition of World News Today.

The programme also aired on other networks. It premiered on 2 January 2018 on PBS stations in the United States. It appears that it had been cancelled on PBS after the introduction of an hour long Amanpour & Company programme debuted the week of 10 September 2018. It also aired on BBC Four.

In late August to December 2019, Kay moved to Senegal with her family to write her latest book. Michelle Fleury was the main stand-in Washington anchor during this period.

In March 2020, the programme was suspended due to COVID-19 pandemic, however, Kay and Fraser often co-presented a half-hour weekly look at what's going on both sides of the Atlantic at 19:30 on Thursday and/or Friday.

On 17 August 2020, the programme returned as BBC News with Katty and Christian.

On 24 June 2021, the last programme in its previous format aired. In the back half of the final programme, frequent contributors Jon Sopel and Ron Christie featured, as well as a compilation of some of the show's highlights over the years.

Format
The one hour-long programme originally aired at 19:00 GMT/BST weekdays on the BBC News Channel in the UK, which meant 14:00 EST on BBC World News. In August 2020, the show moved to 21:00 GMT/BST in the UK, which means 16:00 EST on BBC World News.

Interviews were carried out both in the Washington studio and the London studio, with Kay and Fraser contributing to each other's interviews. Regular contributors to the programme included Ron Christie, a Republican strategist who served as a former adviser to George W. Bush, BBC North America editor and relief presenter Jon Sopel, and political correspondents Rajini Vaidyanathan (Washington), Adam Fleming and Iain Watson (Westminster). In mid-2019, Vaidyanathan moved to Delhi and left the programme and John Pienaar - a former contributor - left the BBC to join Times Radio.

Presenters

Presenters

Former presenters

References

External links

 (BBC News)
Beyond 100 Days (BBC World News)

2017 British television series debuts
2020s British television series
BBC World News shows
British television news shows
2010s British political television series
2020s British political television series
BBC television news shows
British political television series
2010s American political television series
2020s American political television series
English-language television shows
Media about the Trump presidency